S.S. Jain Subodh Law College situated at Jaipur, Rajasthan, India, is affiliated to the University of Rajasthan, Jaipur, which was established in 2010. Subodh law college (SLC) was established under the aegis of S.S Jain Subodh Shiksha Samiti to maintain high standards in providing quality legal education. It is affiliated to Rajasthan University and also recognized by Bar Council of India. In a short span of time the college of law has marked its distinct place in the state of Rajasthan. It is approved by Bar Council of India.

References

Law schools in Rajasthan
Jaipur district
Educational institutions established in 2010
2010 establishments in Rajasthan